The election of Christian III as king of Denmark on 4 July 1534 was a landmark event for all of Denmark and also Norway. It took place in St. Søren's Church in the town of Rye in eastern Jutland, where the Jutlandic nobility elected Prince Christian, son of King Frederick I and Duke of Schleswig and Holsten, as king. This brought about the Count's Feud and later also led to the implementation of the Protestant Reformation in Denmark and Norway.

Christian (1503–1559) was a zealous Protestant who had witnessed the defence of Martin Luther at the Diet of Worms, and he had already carried out the Reformation in the Duchy of Holstein and Duchy of Schleswig. Christian's views made it difficult to gain the support of a majority of the Council of the Realm as most noblemen and, of course, the bishops would rather see a Roman Catholic king on the throne.

Among the supporters of Christian were Steward of the Realm, Mogens Gøye (ca. 1470–1544). Mogens Gøye  was a Danish statesman and the Royal councillor of several Danish Kings. Gøye was among the originators of the meeting in Rye Church between eight Jutlandic members of the Council and the four Jutlandic bishops.

Members of the lesser nobility had also turned up – presumably on Mogens Gøye's initiative – but had to stay outside the church. The lengthy discussion about the election eventually made them lose patience, and they forced their way into the church and demanded to know who opposed the election of Prince Christian. After that, the opponents finally gave up.  Ove Bille, Bishop of Aarhus, wept when he signed the request for the Protestant Duke to become king, realising that it would mean his own downfall.

Although hesitant, Christian accepted the election and was cheered at a meeting in Horsens on 18 August 1534, where he declared that he would, like his predecessors, sign a håndfæstning (charter), although with a reform of ecclesiastical affairs, i.e. the implementation of the Protestant Reformation in Denmark and Norway.

References

Other sources
Colding, Poul Studier i Danmarks politiske historie i slutningen af Christian IIs og begyndelsen af Frederik IIs tid (Copenhagen, 1939)
Lausten, Martin Schwarz   Christian 3. og kirken 1537–1559 (Copenhagen, 1987)

Denmark–Norway
Reformation in Denmark
1534 in Denmark
16th-century elections
1534 in politics
1534 in Norway
Non-partisan elections